Eton Wick is a village in Berkshire, England (historically Buckinghamshire), on the River Thames in the civil parish of Eton, close to the historic towns of Windsor and Eton, Slough and Dorney Lake, the rowing venue for the 2012 Summer Olympics.

History
After the construction of Eton College in the 15th century, a small group of houses were built immediately west to the college grounds. Making up the homes of shoemakers, tailors, and other workers who worked in the college, the hamlet was physically separated from the rest of Eton by land owned by the college, and was known as the wick. The wick was on the very edge of the parish, on the opposite side of the border adjacent to the village; cottages were built to house farmhands working at nearby Bell Farm. Throughout the 19th century, scholars at Eton College took a personal interest in the village. Building a village hall and a small school in the village, the college was traditionally responsible for the social well-being of the settlement. The village grew rapidly between the 1880s and the 2000s.

In 1880, the owner of Bell Farm, Charles Dorney, sold some of his land for residential building. The new village was called Boveney New Town. After the Civil Parish Act 1894, the Wick was transferred from Eton parish to Boveney parish and became known as Eton Wick. Eton Wick and Boveney New Town were almost immediately next to each other yet both retained their own councils until 1934. The population of the villages during this time was around 500. After the Second World War, both villages were expanded and built into each other as part of the wider national push for more housing, bringing the population up to around 3,000. In 1965, the land surrounding the village was registered as common land under the Commons Registration Act, meaning the land cannot be developed without permission from the Secretary of State for the Environment.

Transport
Eton Wick shares its major transport facilities with Slough, as the route to Windsor by road is circuitous. The M4 and A4 roads are nearby. At Slough, there is access to trains into London Paddington station and west to places such as Maidenhead, Reading and Bristol.

Local rivers
As it flows from Boveney to Windsor, the River Thames meets the Boveney Ditch stream just south east of Eton Wick. Boveney Ditch is formed by the merging of Roundmoor (drainage) Ditch and the habitually dried up Cress Brook just west of Eton Wick.  After Romney Lock and weir, the Thames is fed by Colenorton Brook (called Common Ditch upstream of Eton College) and then the Willow Brook (called Chalvey Ditch upstream of the College) to the east of Eton Wick. More recently the Jubilee River, an artificial secondary channel to the Thames, was built between Maidenhead and Datchet for flood relief. It was completed in 2002 and runs to the north of Eton Wick, cutting through the Roundmoor, Chalvey and Common Ditches, which are all carried in siphons beneath it to continue on their original courses.

Politics

The village is part of the Royal Borough of Windsor and Maidenhead and is administered by an elected Unitary Authority. The current MP (2020) for the Windsor constituency (of which Eton Wick is a part) is Adam Afriyie of the (Conservative party). The village was administered by Buckinghamshire County Council until 1974, when the administration was transferred to Berkshire County Council under the Local Government Act 1972.

Sport and leisure
Eton Wick has a local football team, Eton Wick F.C., that plays at Hayward's Mead.

See also
Baths Island

References

Sources

External links

 Eton Wick history

Villages in Berkshire
Eton, Berkshire